The Collection is a greatest hits compilation by British duo Alisha's Attic.

Track listing
 "Alisha Rules the World" - 4:34
 "I Am, I Feel" - 4:01
 "The Incidentals" - 3:09
 "Air We Breathe"	- 4:38
 "Pretender Got My Heart" - 4:07
 "Indestructible" - 3:30
 "Wish I Were You" - 3:48
 "Barbarella" - 3:57
 "Indestructible" - Live & Acoustic From The Kashmir Klub - 2:59
 "If You Want Me Back" - Live & Acoustic From The Kashmir Klub - 2:26
 "Push It All Aside" - 3:31
 "Karmically Close" - 3:37
 "Are You Jealous?" - 3:55
 "The Golden Rule" - 1:35
 "Pretender Got My Heart" - Boiler House Boys Remix - 3:20
 "Air We Breathe" - Talvin Singh Mix - 6:57
 "I Am, I Feel" - Junior Vasquez Urban Mix - 5:59

References

Alisha's Attic albums
2003 compilation albums
Universal Music Group compilation albums